Stephanie Lawrence (16 December 1949 – 4 November 2000) was a British musical theatre actress.

Background

Stephanie Lawrence was born in 1949 in Newcastle upon Tyne, Tyne and Wear, England. She was the daughter of a Welsh singer, to whom she credited her voice, and a classically trained dancer. She moved to Hayling Island at the age of four. From an early age she was close friends with another famous Islander, Peter Chilvers, who, in 1958, invented the windsurfer.

Career

Theatre 
Having trained at the Arts Educational School, Tring, Hertfordshire (now Tring Park School for the Performing Arts), she made her debut in The Nutcracker at the Royal Festival Hall in London in 1962. She became a member of the corps de ballet at the Royal Festival Ballet at the age of 12 with the intention of becoming a ballerina, however, her plans were disrupted when she was forced to miss a year after contracting pneumonia aged 15.

Her West End debut came in April 1971, playing the part of a rollerskating tap dancer in Forget-Me-Not Lane. Her first musical appearance in the West End was in Bubbling Brown Sugar.

Evita 
In 1980, Lawrence was cast as the alternate to Marti Webb as Eva Peron in the musical Evita, written by Tim Rice and Andrew Lloyd Webber. Webb had previously played the role while Elaine Paige was on holiday and was persuaded by director Hal Prince to remain with the production to perform twice weekly, in anticipation of succeeding from Paige at the end of her contract. This established a precedent which would continue for the remainder of the show's London run. Lawrence subsequently graduated from alternate to main performer in 1981.

Musical theatre in the 1980s 
During the 1980s, Lawrence carved out a career as one of the leading female musical theatre performers in London.

She left Evita to create the title role of Marilyn Monroe in Marilyn! the Musical, which won her outstanding reviews and the Best Actress of the Year Award from the Variety Club of Great Britain as well as a nomination from the Society of West End Theatre Awards (now the Laurence Olivier Awards).

She was then cast as Pearl, the principal female role, in the original London production of Starlight Express, in which she performed on roller-skates.

Lawrence appeared in a musical version of The Blue Angel at the Bristol Old Vic, in which she played the character of Lola-Lola, made famous by Marlene Dietrich in the movie of the same name.

In 1987, she appeared as Louise in the first replacement cast of the Dave Clark musical Time, opposite David Cassidy.

Immediately afterwards, she succeeded Nichola McAucliffe as Kate/Lili Vanessi in the RSC production of Kiss Me Kate at the Savoy Theatre. Over Christmas of 1988 into early 1989 she played the eponymous Cinderella in the pantomime, opposite Lionel Blair as Buttons. In 1990 she toured with the musical Blues in the Night playing The Woman of the World.

"Straight" theatre 
In 1986, Lawrence took on her first dramatic part as Doris in The Owl and the Pussycat touring with Peter Davison. Soon after this she appeared at Oslo International Cabaret in her one-woman show.

Blood Brothers 
In 1990, Lawrence took the role of Mrs. Johnstone in the revival of Willy Russell's Blood Brothers. She played the role for three years, first at the Albery Theatre then subsequently the Phoenix Theatre in London, before moving to create the role in the original Broadway production at the Music Box Theatre in New York City (1993). She was nominated for a Tony Award and won the Theatre World Award for Outstanding Broadway Debut. She would play the part of Mrs Johnstone on and off for the next few years, during which she performed on the 1995 London Cast Recording. She had to pull out of the production after suffering from exhaustion. After her untimely death, the London production's souvenir brochure included a tribute on the rear cover for a number of years.

Later career 
Lawrence was cast in the role of Grizabella in Cats in the West End in 1998. During this time, she received critical injuries after falling down a flight of stairs.

Film 
In 1987, Lawrence was cast as Frannie in the film Buster, opposite Phil Collins, Julie Walters and Larry Lamb. The film depicted the story of Great Train Robbery of 1963, with her character being the wife of gang leader Bruce Reynolds. Her other film credits include The Likely Lads (1976) and the role of La Carlotta in The Phantom of the Opera (1989).

Television 
Lawrence was briefly a member of the dance troupe Pan's People, during the late 1970s, long after the troupe had ceased performing on Top of the Pops.

Lawrence portrayed Mary Magdalene in the ITV play Doubting Thomas in 1983.

In 1982, Lawrence appeared in the BBC Two series The Vocal Touch, in an episode which was a showcase for her talents as a singer and actress. She was featured in an episode of Night Music on BBC One in 1983 and Six Fifty-Five on BBC Two during the same year. She also appeared on Des O'Connor Tonight, Pete Sayers' Electric Music Show, The Two Ronnies, Wogan, It's Max Boyce, Pebble Mill at One and The Les Dawson Show.

Recording 
In 1979, she recorded a duet with Johnny Mathis, "You Saved My Life", which featured on his Columbia Records album Mathis Magic. In 1986 she sang "A Special Kind of Hero", written by Rick Wakeman for the official FIFA film of the tournament.

From 1990 onwards, she appeared in a number of recordings for Pickwick Records series The Shows Collection, which was produced by Gordon Lorenz and featured compilations from musical theatre, including a number of Andrew Lloyd Webber shows. Other regular performers on the albums included Paul Jones, Fiona Hendley, Jess Conrad and Carl Wayne. In 1993, Pickwick released Footlights: A Tribute to Andrew Lloyd Webber, a rare solo album in the series.

Personal life 
Lawrence married Laurie Sautereau in September 2000.

Death
Lawrence died on 4 November 2000, aged 50, from liver disease. She was found by her husband at their London home.

Discography

Solo albums

Singles 

 "Time and Emotion Man" (1979)
"You Saved My Life" (1979) with Johnny Mathis
 "Only He Has the Power to Move Me" (1984)
 "Am I Asking Too Much?" (1985)
 "A Special Kind of Hero" (1986 FIFA World Cup theme)
 "You Saved My Life"

Cast recordings 
 Bubbling Brown Sugar: Original London Cast Recording
 Swan Esther – studio concept recording (1983)
 Starlight Express: Original Cast Recording (1984)
 Blood Brothers: The 1995 London Cast Recording (1995)
 In The Red

Compilation albums

Theatre

Filmography

References

External links
 Obituary from The Guardian, 6 November 2000
 Obituary from The Independent, 8 November 2000
 BBC news of death Tuesday, 7 November 2000, 19:58 GMT

1949 births
2000 deaths
People educated at the Arts Educational Schools
Deaths from liver disease
Alcohol-related deaths in England
English female dancers
English musical theatre actresses
English stage actresses
English television actresses
People from Hayling Island
Actresses from London
People educated at Tring Park School for the Performing Arts
20th-century British actresses
20th-century English singers
Actresses from Newcastle upon Tyne
20th-century English women singers